Daniel Asselo Okito Wankoy is a politician from the Democratic Republic of the Congo. He is Minister of the Interior, Security, Decentralization and Traditional Affairs in the Lukonde cabinet. He was born in lodja in province of sankuru.

References 

Living people
Democratic Republic of the Congo politicians
Government ministers of the Democratic Republic of the Congo
Year of birth missing (living people)